Mohammad Ali Jenah Expressway is a short expressway in Tehran that connects Second Sadeghiye Square to Azadi Square. The expressway is named after the founder and first Governor General of Pakistan  Muhammad Ali Jinnah.

References

Expressways in Tehran
Iran–Pakistan relations
Memorials to Muhammad Ali Jinnah